Ma Marc is a Chinese actor. He appeared in many Chinese movies and TV dramas as supporting roles.  He joined Universe International Holding Limited in March 2011.

Personal life
Ma was born in Lanzhou, the capital city of Gansu Province in Northwest China.  His father was a drama actor, therefore he was interested in acting.  When he was graduated from high school, he left his hometown and came to Beijing for entrance exam of Central Academy of Drama.  However he failed the exam. To pursue his dream, he became one of the Beijing drifters. Ma mentioned in an interview that he earned his living in Beijing by working as waiter and car wash worker at that time.

In year 2000, he worked as production assistant in a TV drama production company.  In year 2003, he acted as the role "You Tanzhi" in the TV drama Demi-Gods and Semi-Devils directed by Zhang Jizhong.  Since then he has been cast in an increasing number of roles.

In the movie The White Storm (2013), he acted as an uppity young Tsimshatsui gangster Dune Kun and built good reputation in China.

Filmography

Awards

Hundred Flowers Awards

References

External links 

1979 births
Living people
Male actors from Gansu